The 2016–17 Greek Basket League was the 77th season of the Greek Basket League, the top-tier level professional club basketball league in Greece. The season started on 8 October 2016, and ended on 11 June 2017. Panathinaikos Superfoods won its 35th title in club history, after beating Olympiacos 3–2 in the Finals.

Teams

Promotion and relegation
Nea Kifissia, Arkadikos, and Kavala were relegated after the 2015–16 Greek Basket League. 
Kymis Seajets, Promitheas Patras, and Doxa Lefkadas were promoted from the 2015–16 Greek A2 Basket League.

Locations and arenas

Personnel and kits

European competitions

Regular season

League table

Results

Positions by round 
The table lists the positions of teams after completion of each round.

Playoffs

Bracket

First round

Quarterfinals

Semifinals

Third place

Finals

Final standings

Awards

MVP
 Nick Calathes – Panathinaikos

Best Young Player
 Antonis Koniaris – PAOK

Best Defender
 Nick Calathes – Panathinaikos

Most Improved Player
 Nikola Milutinov – Olympiacos

Coach of the Year
 Xavi Pascual – Panathinaikos

Statistics
The Greek Basket League counts official stats leaders by stats totals, and not by per game averages. It also counts the total stats for both regular season and playoffs combined.

| width=50% valign=top |

Points

|}
|}
 
| width=50% valign=top |

Assists

|}
|}
{| width=100% 
| width=50% valign=top |

Source widgets.baskethotel.com/site/esake

Season highs

Awards

Weekly MVP

Source: ESAKE (Greek)

Season awards

See also
2016–17 Greek Basketball Cup
2016–17 Greek A2 Basket League (2nd tier)

References

External links 
 Official Basket League Site 
 Official Basket League Site 
 Official Hellenic Basketball Federation Site 

Greek Basket League seasons
1
Greek